The 1975 Detroit Tigers compiled a record of 57–102, the fifth worst season in Detroit Tigers history. They finished in last place in the American League East, 37½ games behind the Boston Red Sox. Their team batting average of .249 and team ERA of 4.27 were the second worst in the American League. They were outscored by their opponents 786 to 570.

Offseason 
 November 18, 1974: Ed Brinkman was traded by the Tigers to the St. Louis Cardinals, and Bob Strampe and Dick Sharon were traded by the Tigers to the San Diego Padres as part of a three-team trade. The Padres sent Nate Colbert to the Tigers, and a player to be named later to the Cardinals. The Cardinals sent Alan Foster, Rich Folkers, and Sonny Siebert to the Padres. The Padres completed the deal by sending Danny Breeden to the Cardinals on December 12.
 December 4, 1974: Woodie Fryman was traded by the Tigers to the Montreal Expos for Tom Walker and Terry Humphrey.
 January 9, 1975: Tom Brookens was drafted by the Tigers in the 1st round (4th pick) of the 1975 Major League Baseball draft.
 February 1, 1975: Gene Michael was signed as a free agent by the Tigers.
 March 29, 1975: Reggie Sanders was traded by the Tigers to the Atlanta Braves for Jack Pierce.

Regular season

Season standings

Record vs. opponents

Notable transactions 
 June 15, 1975: Nate Colbert was purchased from the Tigers by the Montreal Expos.

Roster

Player stats

Batting

Starters by position 
Note: Pos = Position; G = Games played; AB = At bats; H = Hits; Avg. = Batting average; HR = Home runs; RBI = Runs batted in

Other batters 
Note: G = Games played; AB = At bats; H = Hits; Avg. = Batting average; HR = Home runs; RBI = Runs batted in

Pitching

Starting pitchers 
Note: G = Games; IP = Innings pitched; W = Wins; L = Losses; ERA = Earned run average; SO = Strikeouts

Other pitchers 
Note: G = Games; IP = Innings pitched; W = Wins; L = Losses; ERA = Earned run average; SO = Strikeouts

Relief pitchers 
Note: G = Games pitched; W = Wins; L= Losses; SV = Saves; GF = Games finished; ERA = Earned run average; SO = Strikeouts

Awards and honors 
1975 Major League Baseball All-Star Game
Bill Freehan, reserve

League top ten finishers 
Joe Coleman
 AL leader in wild pitches (15)
 #2 in MLB in losses (18)
 #2 in MLB in earned runs allowed (124)
 #4 in AL in hit batsmen(9)

Ron LeFlore
 #2 in AL in strikeouts (139)
 #2 in MLB in times caught stealing (20)

Mickey Lolich
 #2 in MLB in losses (18)
 #6 in MLB in complete games (19)

Dan Meyer
 AL leader in at bats per strikeout (18.8)

Willie Horton
 #3 in AL in game played (159)
 #4 in AL in at bats (615)

Players ranking among top 100 all time at position 
The following members of the 1975 Detroit Tigers are among the Top 100 of all time at their position, as ranked by The Bill James Historical Baseball Abstract in 2001:
 Bill Freehan: 12th best catcher of all time
 Aurelio Rodríguez: 91st best third baseman of all time
 Ron LeFlore: 80th best center fielder of all time
 Ben Oglivie: 64th best left fielder of all time
 Willie Horton: 55th best left fielder of all time (played DH for 1975 Tigers)
 Mickey Lolich: 72nd best pitcher of all time

Farm system 

LEAGUE CHAMPIONS: Evansville, Montgomery

Notes

References 

 1975 Detroit Tigers Regular Season Statistics at Baseball Reference

Detroit Tigers seasons
Detroit Tigers season
Detroit Tiger
1975 in Detroit